Alessandro Piccolomini was a Roman Catholic prelate who served as Bishop of Pienza (1535–1563) and Bishop of Montalcino (1528–1554).

Biography
On 20 November 1528, Alessandro Piccolomini was appointed during the papacy of Pope Clement VII as Bishop of Montalcino.
In 1535, he was appointed during the papacy of Pope Paul III as Bishop of Pienza. 
In 1554, he resigned as Bishop of Montalcino. 
He served as Bishop of Pienza until his resignation in December 1563.

While bishop, he was the principal co-consecrator of Francesco Maria Piccolomini, Bishop of Montalcino (1554).

References

External links and additional sources
 (for Chronology of Bishops) 
 (for Chronology of Bishops) 
 (for Chronology of Bishops) 
 (for Chronology of Bishops) 

16th-century Italian Roman Catholic bishops
Bishops appointed by Pope Clement VII
Bishops appointed by Pope Paul III
Bishops of Pienza